Anthene staudingeri, Staudinger's ciliate blue, is a butterfly in the family Lycaenidae. It is found in Sierra Leone, Ghana, Nigeria (south and the Cross River loop), Cameroon, Gabon, the Democratic Republic of the Congo, Uganda, western Kenya and western Tanzania. The habitat consists of primary forests.

Subspecies
Anthene staudingeri staudingeri (Sierra Leone, Ghana, Nigeria, Cameroon, Gabon, Democratic Republic of the Congo, Uganda, Tanzania)
Anthene staudingeri obsoleta (Stempffer, 1947) (Kenya)

References

Butterflies described in 1894
Anthene
Butterflies of Africa